Charles Edwin Featherstone (born 18 December 1852, date of death unknown) was an Australian politician.

Featherstone was born in Hobart in Tasmania in 1852. In 1889 he was elected to the Tasmanian House of Assembly, representing the seat of Sorell. He served until his disqualification due to bankruptcy in 1893. His date of death is unknown.

References

1852 births
Year of death unknown
Members of the Tasmanian House of Assembly